The 2022 German Masters (officially the 2022 BildBet German Masters) was a professional ranking snooker tournament that took place from 26 to 30 January 2022 at the Tempodrom in Berlin, Germany. The tournament was the ninth ranking event of the 2021–22 snooker season and the 16th edition of the German Masters, first held in 1995 as the German Open. The fifth of eight tournaments in the European Series, it was the first professional snooker tournament held outside the United Kingdom in almost two years, due to the impact of the COVID-19 pandemic. 

Judd Trump was the defending champion, having defeated Jack Lisowski 9–2 in the 2021 final. However, Trump lost 1–5 in the quarter-finals to Zhao Xintong, who went on to meet Yan Bingtao in the final. Aged 24 and 21 respectively, Zhao and Yan had the youngest combined age of any two ranking finalists since Neil Robertson played Jamie Cope at the 2006 Grand Prix. It was the second time that two players from mainland China contested a ranking final; the previous occasion was the 2013 Shanghai Masters final between Ding Junhui and Xiao Guodong. Zhao whitewashed Yan 9–0 in the final to win the second ranking title of his career. He became the third player in professional snooker history, after Steve Davis at the 1989 Grand Prix and Robertson at the January 2020 European Masters, to win a two-session ranking final without conceding a frame. 

The tournament's highest break was achieved by Thepchaiya Un-Nooh, who made the third maximum break of his career in his first qualifying round match against Fan Zhengyi.

Prize fund 
The event features a total prize fund of £400,000 with the winner receiving £80,000. The event is the fifth of the eight events in the European Series, all sponsored by sports betting company BetVictor. (BildBet is BetVictor's German sports betting platform, launched in partnership with the German tabloid newspaper Bild.) The player accumulating the highest amount of prize money over the eight events will receive a bonus of £150,000.

 Winner: £80,000
 Runner-up: £35,000
 Semi-final: £20,000
 Quarter-final: £10,000
 Last 16: £5,000
 Last 32: £4,000
 Last 64: £3,000
 Highest break: £5,000
 Total: £400,000

Main draw
Below are the event's results from the last-32 stage to the final. Player names in bold denote match winners. Numbers in brackets denote player seedings.

Final

Qualifying
Qualifying for the event took place between 18 and 26 October 2021 at the Chase Leisure Centre in Cannock, England. There were two rounds of qualifying, with matches being played as best-of-nine frames.

Century breaks

Main stage centuries

Total: 29

 136, 108  Sam Craigie
 135  Stephen Maguire
 134, 104  Fan Zhengyi
 130  Craig Steadman
 130  Judd Trump
 129, 120  Luca Brecel
 124, 105  Ricky Walden
 124  Shaun Murphy
 122  Kurt Maflin
 119  Mark Selby
 118, 116, 107, 106, 104  Mark Allen
 118, 100  Zhao Xintong
 117, 107  Kyren Wilson
 116  Yan Bingtao
 112  Michael Georgiou
 104, 102  Tom Ford
 104  Liam Highfield
 102  Ryan Day
 101  Noppon Saengkham

Qualifying stage centuries 

Total: 74

 147  Thepchaiya Un-Nooh
 143  Peter Devlin
 141, 136, 123, 114  Zhao Xintong
 141  Alfie Burden
 141  Hossein Vafaei
 140  Joe O'Connor
 140  Zhang Anda
 138  Michael Georgiou
 138  John Higgins
 136  Lu Ning
 135, 134, 103  Neil Robertson
 134, 112  Mark Selby
 133, 122, 120  Mark Allen
 133, 104  Gary Wilson
 133  Fan Zhengyi
 132, 105, 105  Noppon Saengkham
 130  Anthony Hamilton
 128, 108  Cao Yupeng
 128, 103  Mark Williams
 125  Li Hang
 125  Matthew Selt
 123, 104, 104  Kyren Wilson
 122, 102  Wu Yize
 119, 104  Barry Hawkins
 119  Mark Davis
 118, 102, 100  Shaun Murphy
 118  Yan Bingtao
 113, 105  Ashley Hugill
 113, 104  Jamie Jones
 113  Hammad Miah
 113  Barry Pinches
 112, 101  Alexander Ursenbacher
 111  Chang Bingyu
 110, 104  Jack Lisowski
 110  Jamie Clarke
 109  Graeme Dott
 109  Michael White
 108, 103  Jak Jones
 108  Anthony McGill
 107, 107, 102  Ricky Walden
 104  Pang Junxu
 103, 100  Yuan Sijun
 102  Zhou Yuelong
 101  Sunny Akani
 101  Lyu Haotian
 100, 100  Judd Trump

References

2022
German Masters
Masters
Sports competitions in Berlin
January 2022 sports events in Germany
European Series